Schottera nicaeensis is a species of red algae (Rhodophyta) similar to other small red algae particularly Phyllophora.

Description
The thallus consists of short flat fronds rising from a prostrate terete branched holdfast and growing to a length of about 10 cm. It branches once or twice and bears terete proliferations at the tips.

Distribution
In Ireland, S. nicaeensis occurs in Portmuck, in Island Magee. On the western shores of Great Britain, Portugal and in the Mediterranean.

Habitat

References

Phyllophoraceae